Ashton Nicholas Every Mosley (1792–1875) was a High Sheriff of Derbyshire in 1835. He was the son of Ashton Nicholas Mosley (1768–1830) and Mary Morley Elliott Bird Every Mosley (1753–1826). Ashton Nicholas Mosley was the second son of Sir John Mosley, 1st Baronet.

Biography
Every Mosley's wife, Mary Theresa, was born in 1797 in Hemsworth and she had inherited a fortune from her father at the age of sixteen. They married in 1820 and their son, also called Ashton Nicholas Every Mosley, was born the following year. Every Mosley's ancestors were Lord Mayor of Manchester whilst his father in law, William, had left his wife thousand of pounds in cash, a mansion house and lands in Empsall, South Kirkby and Hensall. In 1824, Mosley built Burnaston House which was actually just within Etwall parish.

He was the High Sheriff of Derbyshire in 1835. His son lived at Burnaston House who was a County Magistrate and Colonel of the 1st Derby Militia. His other son, Roland, was a rector in Egginton.

References

1792 births
1875 deaths
People from Derbyshire
High Sheriffs of Derbyshire